Live! Worldwide is a live album by Terrance Simien and the Zydeco Experience, released in 2007 through Aim Trading Group. The album earned Simien the Grammy Award for Best Zydeco or Cajun Music Album.

Track listing

Personnel
 Jose Alvarez – Guitar, Vocals
 Bob Dylan – Composer
 Ralph Fontenot – Frottoir
 Alexandra Huddleston – Images, Photography
 Jillian Johnson – Package Design
 Francis Scott Key – Composer
 The Meters – Composer
 Ziggy Modeliste – Composer
 Joshua Murrell – Mastering, Mixing, Producer
 Cynthia Simien – Package Design
 Terrance Simien – Accordion, Arranger, Composer, Mastering, Mixing, Producer, Vocals
 Robert Sturman – Cover Image
 William Terry – Bass
 Danny Williams – Keyboards, Mastering, Mixing, Photography, Producer, Vocals

References

2007 live albums
Grammy Award for Best Zydeco or Cajun Music Album